Chris Penn (born April 20, 1971) is a former American football wide receiver who played for six seasons in the National Football League (NFL) with the Kansas City Chiefs, the Chicago Bears, and the San Diego Chargers. He was picked by the Chiefs in the third round of the 1994 NFL Draft. He is son to James Penn of Nowata, Oklahoma. Penn attended Northeastern Oklahoma A&M College for two years prior to transferring to University of Tulsa.

References

See also 
 List of NCAA major college football yearly receiving leaders

1971 births
Living people
People from Nowata County, Oklahoma
American football wide receivers
Tulsa Golden Hurricane football players
Kansas City Chiefs players
Chicago Bears players
San Diego Chargers players
Northeastern Oklahoma A&M Golden Norsemen football players